Christina María Aguilera (born December 18, 1980) is an American singer, songwriter, actress, and television personality. Known for her four-octave vocal range and ability to sustain high notes, she has been referred to as the "Voice of a Generation". Her works, which incorporate feminism, sexuality, and domestic violence, have generated both critical praise and controversy, for which she is often cited as an influence by other artists. 

After appearing in several television programs as a child, Aguilera rose to prominence in 1999 with the release of her debut album, Christina Aguilera, through RCA Records. The album spawned three Billboard Hot 100 number-one singles — "Genie in a Bottle", "What a Girl Wants" and "Come On Over Baby (All I Want Is You)" — and earned her the Grammy Award for Best New Artist. The album's musical direction is credited with influencing the revival of teen pop in the late 1990s and early 2000s, while its Spanish-language follow up, Mi Reflejo (2000), is noted for contributing to the 2000s Latin pop boom. Displeased with the nature of her earlier work, Aguilera assumed artistic control of her fourth studio album, Stripped (2002). The music video for the album's lead single "Dirrty" sparked controversy for exploring her sexuality, leading to the departure of her teen idol image. However, further singles "Beautiful", "Fighter" and "Can't Hold Us Down" became top-ten singles in many countries, and she was named the most successful female artist of 2003.

Her fifth album, Back to Basics (2006), was met with favorable reviews and became the second of her career to debut atop of the Billboard 200. Its singles "Ain't No Other Man", "Candyman" and "Hurt" reached the top-ten positions in most countries. In 2010, Aguilera starred in Burlesque and contributed to its soundtrack. In subsequent years, she featured on the successful singles "Feel This Moment", "Say Something", and "Moves Like Jagger". The latter reached number one on the Billboard Hot 100 making Aguilera one of the few artists to reach the top spot over three decades. Outside of her music, she was named a spokesperson for the World Food Program (WFP), served as a coach on reality competition show The Voice (2011–2016), and acted in the drama series Nashville (2015).

Aguilera is considered a pop culture icon and is generally described as a triple threat entertainer. With estimated sales over 90 million records, she is recognized as one of the world's best-selling music artists. In 2009, she was classified as the twentieth most successful artist of the 2000s by Billboard. Throughout her career, she has accumulated numerous awards and accolades, including five Grammy Awards, two Latin Grammy Awards, two MTV Video Music Awards (VMA), one Billboard Music Award, one Guinness World Record, a star on the Hollywood Walk of Fame, and was named a Disney Legend. Aguilera is regarded as one of the most influential Latin artists in the entertainment industry; in 2013, Time listed her among the 100 most influential people in the world, and was ranked as the eighth greatest woman in music by VH1. Furthermore, she has been deemed one of the greatest singers in contemporary pop music, ranked among the greatest of all time by magazines such as Rolling Stone and Consequence of Sound.

Early life and education
Aguilera was born in Staten Island, New York City on December 18, 1980, the eldest of two daughters to musician Shelly Loraine Kearns (née Fidler) and United States Army soldier Fausto Xavier Aguilera. Her father was born in Ecuador, and her mother is of German, Irish, Welsh, and Dutch ancestry. The family moved frequently because of his military service, living in New Jersey, Texas, New York, Japan, and ultimately settling in Pennsylvania. Aguilera said he was physically and emotionally abusive. She used music to escape her turbulent household. Following her parents' divorce when she was six years old, Aguilera, her younger sister Rachel, and her mother moved into her grandmother's home in Rochester, Pennsylvania, a suburb of Pittsburgh. Her mother later remarried to Jim Kearns with whom she had a son named Michael. In 2012, after years of estrangement, Aguilera expressed interest in reconciling with her father.

As a child, she was drawn to soul and blues records her grandmother bought and would practice singing, which earned her a reputation as "the little girl with the big voice" in her neighborhood. Aguilera aspired to be a singer and won her first talent show at age eight with a rendition of Whitney Houston's "I Wanna Dance with Somebody (Who Loves Me)". At age 10, she performed "A Sunday Kind of Love" on the competition show Star Search, and was eliminated during the semi-final round. She performed the song again on KDKA-TV's Wake Up with Larry Richert. During her youth in the Pittsburgh metropolitan area, Aguilera sang "The Star-Spangled Banner" before Pittsburgh Penguins hockey, Pittsburgh Steelers football, and Pittsburgh Pirates baseball games, and the 1992 Stanley Cup Finals in Pittsburgh. She attended Marshall Middle School in Wexford, Pennsylvania and North Allegheny Intermediate High School in McCandless, Pennsylvania before leaving the school to be homeschooled and avoid bullying she experienced there.

Career

1991–1998: Career beginnings
In 1991, Aguilera auditioned for a position on the Disney Channel's The Mickey Mouse Club, though did not meet its age requirements. She joined the television series two years later, which featured her performing musical numbers and sketch comedy until its cancellation in 1994. Fellow cast members included Ryan Gosling, Keri Russell, Britney Spears, and Justin Timberlake. After the show ended, Aguilera moved to Japan and recorded her first song, "All I Wanna Do", a duet with Japanese singer Keizo Nakanishi. In 1998, Aguilera returned to the US to seek a recording contract. She approached RCA Records, who told her to contact Walt Disney Records instead because they were having financial difficulties. She sent her cover version of Whitney Houston's "Run to You" to Disney in hopes of being selected to record the theme song "Reflection" for their animated film Mulan (1998). Aguilera was ultimately selected to sing "Reflection"; the song was released in June 1998 and charted on the Billboard Adult Contemporary chart at number 15.

1999–2001: Christina Aguilera, Mi Reflejo, and My Kind of Christmas
After "Reflection", Aguilera attracted the attention of RCA's A&R Ron Fair and was signed with the label quickly afterwards. RCA was pressured by the contemporary teen pop craze evoked by Aguilera's peer Britney Spears, leading to the label rushing production of the album and aligning Aguilera to be part of the teen pop trend. They released the lead single from the album, "Genie in a Bottle", a trendy pop and R&B track, in June 1999. The single rose Aguilera to stardom, peaking atop the US Billboard Hot 100 and charts of 20 other countries. It has sold over seven million copies as of 2014. Aguilera's eponymous debut album followed in August 1999 and peaked at number one on the US Billboard 200. It was certified eight times platinum by the Recording Industry Association of America (RIAA), and had moved 17 million copies worldwide by 2010. The album produced three other singles: two US number-one singles "What a Girl Wants" and "Come On Over Baby (All I Want Is You)", and one US top-five single "I Turn to You", a cover of All-4-One's song. At the 42nd Annual Grammy Awards in February 2000, Aguilera won Best New Artist.

Aguilera's two following studio albums, Mi Reflejo and My Kind of Christmas, were released in September and October 2000, respectively. The former, a Spanish-language album consisting of re-recorded versions of tracks on Aguilera's debut album and several original songs, topped the Billboard Top Latin Albums for 19 consecutive weeks and was certified six times platinum in the Latin field by the RIAA. It won Best Female Pop Vocal Album at the 2nd Annual Latin Grammy Awards in 2001. The latter contains covers of Christmas popular songs and a few original dance-pop tunes, and was certified platinum by the RIAA. In support of her albums, Aguilera embarked on her first concert tour, Christina Aguilera in Concert, from mid-2000 to early 2001. The tour visited North America, Europe, South America, and Japan. Billboard in 2000 recognized Aguilera as the Top Female Pop Act of the Year. Despite the successes, Aguilera was displeased with the music and image her manager Steve Kurtz had aligned her to, feeling unable to control her own image. In October 2000, she filed a fiduciary duty lawsuit against Kurtz for improper, undue, and inappropriate influence over her professional activities. After terminating Kurtz's services, RCA hired Irving Azoff as Aguilera's new manager.

Aguilera took her first steps in artistic control with a cover of Labelle's "Lady Marmalade" (1974) with Pink, Mýa, and Lil' Kim for the Moulin Rouge! soundtrack. RCA executives initially opposed to Aguilera recording "Lady Marmalade" because it was "too urban", but Aguilera ultimately managed to record the song of her own accord. The collaboration topped the Billboard Hot 100 for five weeks based on airplay alone, becoming the first airplay-only track in history to remain on the chart's top spot for more than one week. It won Best Pop Collaboration with Vocals at the 44th Annual Grammy Awards. In mid-2001, Warlock Records released Just Be Free, a compilation of demo tracks Aguilera recorded in 1994 and 1995, when she was looking forward to an album release after the end of The Mickey Mouse Club. Aguilera filed a suit against Warlock Records and the album's producers to stop the release. The two parties came to a confidential settlement to release the album, in which Aguilera lent out her name, likeness, and image for an unspecified amount of damages.

2002–2003: Stripped

While working on her fourth studio album, Aguilera leaned toward a new artistic direction that she felt had more musical and lyrical depth. She named the album Stripped and explained that the title represented "a new beginning, a re-introduction of [herself] as a new artist in a way". Aguilera served as the album's executive producer and co-wrote most of the songs. To present her new persona, Aguilera released "Dirrty" as the lead single from the album in September 2002. Its accompanying music video generated controversy for depicting overtly sexual fetishes. Aguilera's new image presented in the video was widely criticized by the public that it began to overshadow her music. She defended her new image: "I'm in the power position, in complete command of everything and everybody around me. To be totally balls-out like that is, for me, the measure of a true artist."

Stripped was released in October 2002. The album incorporated various genres from R&B and flamenco to rock, and lyrically revolves around the theme of self-esteem while also discussing sex and gender equality. It received mixed reviews from music critics, who viewed the employment of various musical styles incoherent, but praised Aguilera's vocals. The album peaked at number two on the Billboard 200 and has sold over 4.3 million copies in the US as of 2014. In the UK, the album has sold two million copies as of 2017 and was the second highest-selling album by an American female artist during the 2000s decade, behind Norah Jones with Come Away with Me. By 2006, Stripped had sold over 12 million copies worldwide. The second single from the album, the ballad "Beautiful", received universal acclaim for its empowering lyrics about embracing inner beauty, and became an anthem for the LGBT community. It was the album's best-charting single, peaking at number two on the Billboard Hot 100. The song won Best Female Pop Vocal Performance at the 46th Annual Grammy Awards in 2004.

Stripped was followed by three other singles: "Fighter", "Can't Hold Us Down", and "The Voice Within", all of which were released in 2003 and entered the top 40 on the Billboard Hot 100. During promotion of Stripped, Aguilera cultivated a new image by adopting the alter ego Xtina, dyeing her hair black, and debuting several tattoos and piercings. She co-headlined the Justified and Stripped Tour alongside Justin Timberlake from June to September 2003 in support of Stripped and Timberlake's album Justified (2002), before embarking on her solo Stripped Tour until December. Aguilera attended the 2003 MTV Video Music Awards in August, where she and Britney Spears kissed Madonna during their performance of "Like a Virgin" and "Hollywood", which received considerable media attention. She hosted the 2003 MTV Europe Music Awards, where she won Best Female award, in November. Billboard announced Aguilera as the Top Female Pop Act of 2003.

2004–2009: Marriage, Back to Basics, and first child

In 2004, Aguilera recorded a revised version of Rose Royce's "Car Wash" (1976) with Missy Elliott for the animated film Shark Tale, in which she was a voice actress, and contributed vocals to Nelly's single "Tilt Ya Head Back". She was a featured artist on Herbie Hancock's 2005 cover of Leon Russell's "A Song for You" (1970), which was nominated for Best Pop Collaboration with Vocals at the 48th Annual Grammy Awards in February 2006. During this time, Aguilera started working on her follow-up studio album and embraced a new image inspired by figures of the Classic Hollywood era such as Marilyn Monroe, Marlene Dietrich, and Mary Pickford, debuting blonde curly hair and retro-styled makeup.

Aguilera became engaged to marketing executive Jordan Bratman, who had dated her since 2003, in February 2005. They married on November 19, 2005, at an estate in Napa County, California. Aguilera released the lead single, "Ain't No Other Man", from her fifth studio album, Back to Basics, in June 2006. The song, like the majority of the album, was inspired by Aguilera's marriage and incorporates elements of early 20th-century soul, blues, and jazz. It reached number six on the Billboard Hot 100 and has sold 1.7 million digital copies in the US as of 2014. Its music video saw Aguilera debuting her new alter ego, Baby Jane, inspired by the thriller film What Ever Happened to Baby Jane? (1962).

Back to Basics was released in August 2006. Aguilera described the record, a double album, as a "throwback" to jazz, blues, and soul music of the 1920s, 1930s, and 1940s that incorporates "a modern twist." She was much inspired by works of such classic blues and soul singers as Otis Redding, Millie Jackson, and Nina Simone during the recording sessions. Back to Basics received generally positive reviews from critics, who commented that the retro-oriented production complements Aguilera's vocals. It debuted atop the Billboard 200 and has sold 1.7 million copies in the US. At the 49th Annual Grammy Awards in February 2007, Aguilera won Best Female Pop Vocal Performance for "Ain't No Other Man" and performed "It's a Man's Man's Man's World" as a tribute to the late James Brown. Back to Basics was succeeded by two international top-ten singles: "Hurt" and "Candyman". Two other singles, "Slow Down Baby" and "Oh Mother", were released exclusively in Australia and Europe, respectively. In support of Back to Basics, Aguilera embarked on the Back to Basics Tour, which ran from November 2006 to October 2008. With US$48.1 million grossed, the tour was the highest-grossing solo female tour of 2007.

In January 2008, a son named Max was born to Aguilera and Bratman. Later that year, she appeared in the Martin Scorsese documentary Shine a Light chronicling a two-day concert by The Rolling Stones in New York City's Beacon Theatre, in which Aguilera performs "Live with Me" alongside the band's lead vocalist Mick Jagger. In commemoration of a decade-long career in the music industry, Aguilera released a greatest hits album titled Keeps Gettin' Better: A Decade of Hits exclusively through Target in November 2008, in the US. In addition to previous singles, it includes four original electropop-oriented songs, two of which are remade versions of two previous singles. Aguilera commented that the newly recorded tracks' "futurisic, robotic sound" served as a preview for her follow-up studio album. Keeps Gettin' Better peaked at number nine on the Billboard 200, and its titular single "Keeps Gettin' Better" charted at number seven on the Billboard Hot 100. Billboard in 2009 recognized Aguilera as the 20th most successful artist of the 2000s.

2010–2011: Bionic, Burlesque, and The Voice

Aguilera began working on her sixth studio album during her pregnancy when she frequently listened to electronic music. The lead single from the album, "Not Myself Tonight", was released in March 2010. Heavily influenced by electronic genres, the song signaled Aguilera's musical experiments on her forthcoming album. It peaked at number 23 on the Billboard Hot 100. The album, titled Bionic, was released in June 2010. Categorized as a R&B-flavored futurepop album by critics, Bionic lyrically revolves around sexual themes while also discussing feminism. Critical reaction to the album was mixed; reviewers commended Aguilera's experimentation with new styles, but found it forced and unnatural. The album peaked at number three on the Billboard 200 and has sold 332,000 copies in the US as of 2019. The album spawned one other international single, "You Lost Me". Two other singles from the album, "Woohoo" featuring rapper Nicki Minaj and "I Hate Boys", were released in the US and Europe, and Australia, respectively.

Aguilera starred alongside Cher in the musical film Burlesque. Written and directed by Steve Antin, the film was released in theaters in November 2010. Aguilera played Ali Rose, who quits her bar service job and moves to Los Angeles, where she aspires to be a performer in a burlesque club owned by Tess Scali (Cher). Burlesque grossed US$90 million in the box office and received mixed reviews from critics, who found it clichéd but praised Aguilera's acting. The film received a nomination for Best Motion Picture – Musical or Comedy at the 68th Golden Globe Awards. Aguilera recorded eight tracks for the film's ten-track accompanying soundtrack, and Cher performed the other two. The soundtrack reached number 18 on the Billboard 200 and was certified gold by the RIAA.

At Super Bowl XLV in February 2011, Aguilera omitted a few lines while performing the US national anthem. She apologized for the incident, saying: "I got so caught up in the moment of the song that I lost my place." At the 53rd Annual Grammy Awards, she performed alongside Jennifer Hudson, Martina McBride, Yolanda Adams, and Florence Welch in a segment that paid tribute to soul singer Aretha Franklin. Aguilera finalized her divorce from Jordan Bratman, from whom she had been separated since September 2010, on April 15, 2011. She concurrently started dating Matthew Rutler, an assistant on the set of Burlesque. From April 2011 to December 2012, Aguilera served as a coach on the first three seasons of the television competition series The Voice. During the first season, Aguilera was featured on Maroon 5's single "Moves like Jagger" upon the invitation of the group's lead vocalist and Aguilera's fellow The Voice coach Adam Levine. The single peaked atop the Billboard Hot 100 and was certified diamond by the Recording Industry Association of America (RIAA).

2012–2017: Lotus, second child, and television projects

Upon the third season of The Voice in September 2012, Aguilera released "Your Body" as the lead single from her seventh studio album. The single charted on the Billboard Hot 100 at number 34. The album, titled Lotus, followed in November 2012. Aguilera described the record as a "rebirth" of herself after the personal struggles she overcame. Contemporary reviewers found the album generic and conventional, as opposed to Aguilera's previous experimental ventures. Lotus peaked at number seven on the Billboard 200 and has sold 303,000 copies in the US as of 2019. The album was supported by another single, "Just a Fool", featuring Aguilera's fellow The Voice coach Blake Shelton. In December 2012, Aguilera was replaced by Shakira for the fourth season of The Voice due to wanting to focus on solo projects. She returned for the fifth season in September 2013.

In 2013, Aguilera scored three international top-ten singles. She was featured on rapper Pitbull's "Feel This Moment", which peaked at number eight on the Billboard Hot 100 and was certified platinum by the RIAA. She subsequently appeared on Mexican singer Alejandro Fernández's cover of Miguel Gallardo's "Hoy Tengo Ganas de Ti" (1976), which earned a diamond certification in Mexico. Aguilera collaborated with A Great Big World on the ballad "Say Something", which earned a six-time platinum certification from the RIAA and won Best Pop Duo/Group Performance at the 57th Annual Grammy Awards. Aguilera temporarily withdrew from The Voice for the sixth and seventh seasons, wishing to devote time to her family. She was respectively replaced by Shakira and Gwen Stefani during the two seasons. After her engagement to Matthew Rutler in February 2014 and the birth of their daughter Summer in August, she returned for the eighth season in October. Aguilera's last season on The Voice was the tenth, which she won with her contestant Alisan Porter in May 2016.

Aguilera played a recurring role of Jade St. John, a pop singer who tries to venture out to country music, on the third season of ABC's musical drama series Nashville in April 2015. Two promotional singles were released in order to support her appearance: "The Real Thing" and "Shotgun". She and her partner Rutler served as executive producers for a music-based game show, Tracks, which aired on Spike TV in March 2016.

On June 16, 2016, Aguilera released a song titled "Change" in which she dedicated to the victims of the 2016 Orlando nightclub shooting as well as Christina Grimmie, who was fatally shot in Orlando the day before the nightclub shooting. The proceeds were donated to the National Compassion Fund to benefit the victims' families. Her other works included recording a disco song titled "Telepathy" featuring Nile Rodgers for the soundtrack of Netflix original series The Get Down (2016), being a voice actress for The Emoji Movie (2017), and starring in the romantic science fiction film Zoe released in 2018. In November 2017, Aguilera performed a medley of The Bodyguard songs during the American Music Awards in honor to celebrate Whitney Houston.

2018–2020: Liberation and Christina Aguilera: The Xperience 

Aguilera started working on her eighth studio album in the summer of 2015. "Accelerate" featuring Ty Dolla Sign and 2 Chainz was released as the lead single from the album on May 3, 2018. "Accelerate" became Aguilera's tenth number one song on the US Billboard Dance Songs Chart. It was followed by the promotional single "Twice" on May 11, and the second single "Fall in Line" featuring Demi Lovato on May 16. "Like I Do" featuring GoldLink was released on June 7, 2018, as the album's third and final single. Liberation, was released on June 15, 2018, to favorable reviews. Aguilera heavily incorporated R&B and hip hop on the album to represent her desire for freedom from what she described as the "churning hamster wheel" that was The Voice. Liberation debuted at number six on the Billboard 200 chart, becoming Aguilera's seventh US top-ten album. At the 61st Annual Grammy Awards, "Fall in Line" was nominated for Best Pop Duo/Group Performance, while "Like I Do" received a nomination for Best Rap/Sung Performance. Aguilera starred in the romantic science fiction Zoe, which was premiered at the Tribeca Film festival in April 2018, and was later released on July 20 by Amazon Studios.

To promote Liberation, Aguilera embarked on her first tour in 10 years, The Liberation Tour, which ran from September to November 2018. and a follow-up European tour, The X Tour, which ran from July to December 2019. She also headlined Christina Aguilera: The Xperience, a 25-date concert residency at the Zappos Theater at Planet Hollywood Las Vegas, beginning in May and concluding in March 2020. In October 2019, Aguilera released the soul and blues-inspired song "Haunted Heart" from the soundtrack of the computer-animated Addams Family film, and a month later "Fall on Me"—her second collaboration with A Great Big World—was premiered. On March 6, 2020, Aguilera released "Loyal Brave True" as a promotional single from the live action remake of Mulan. Rolling Stone considered it Oscar-worthy while the song was also shortlisted as one of fifteen potential nominees for the Academy Award for Best Original Song. She released a re-recording of "Reflection" on August 28. In November 2020, Aguilera terminated her working relationship with her manager of 20 years, Irving Azoff. It was later reported that she had signed a management deal with Jay Z's entertainment agency Roc Nation.

2021–present: Aguilera and upcoming documentary 

In July 2021, Aguilera performed for two nights at the Hollywood Bowl with Gustavo Dudamel and the Los Angeles Philharmonic. Both shows were sold out. In early October, Aguilera featured on the soundtrack for The Addams Family 2 performing the theme song from the original series. That same week, Aguilera performed two medleys for ABC's Walt Disney World's 50th Anniversary special with the songs "Reflection", "When You Wish Upon a Star" and "Loyal Brave True". Later that month, she performed "River Deep – Mountain High" at the Rock & Roll Hall of Fame as a tribute for Tina Turner. On December 7, 2021, Aguilera was also honored with the first Music Icon award at the 47th People's Choice Awards.

In early 2021, Aguilera announced that her ninth studio album would be in Spanish, being her first in 22 years, following up Mi Reflejo (2000). The album, titled Aguilera, was originally issued as a double album on May 31, 2022, and included three separately-released parts: La Fuerza, La Tormenta, La Luz. It was preceeded by the singles "Pa Mis Muchachas" with Becky G and Nicki Nicole and featuring Nathy Peluso, "Somos Nada", "Santo" with Ozuna, and "Suéltame" with Tini. Aguilera performed "Pa Mis Muchachas" and "Somos Nada" for the first time at the 22nd Annual Latin Grammy Awards on November 19, 2021. The musical direction of the album pays tribute to different genres of Latin music. Aguilera received widespread critical acclaim from music critics upon release, and was placed on several year-end lists by publications such as Billboard and Huston Chronicle.

On April 1, 2022, Aguilera performed a set at the Dubai Expo 2020 and closed the show with a cover of "A Million Dreams". Aguilera headlined the Los Angeles Pride festival on June 11, 2022, with guest performers Mýa, Kim Petras and Paris Hilton. Her use of a strap-on dildo during her performance with Petras received both praise and controversy from audiences and critics. Later that month, she embarked on the EU / UK Summer Series promotional tour, which consisted of five festival shows throughout Europe and three arena concerts in the United Kingdom. The tour received critical praise over Aguilera's "dazzling vocals". During the show in Liverpool, Aguilera revealed that she had begun working on her tenth studio album, which would be in English. On September 29, 2022, Aguilera performed "La Reina" at the 2022 Billboard Latin Music Awards and received the Billboard Spirit of Hope Award. La Luz, the third and final EP from Aguilera, was released that same day and featured a spoken intro by Aguilera and "No Es Que Te Extrañe". On October 21, 2022, a deluxe 20th anniversary version of Stripped was released and featured two new tracks: "I Will Be" (the b-side to "Dirrty") and Benny Benassi's remix to "Beautiful". A new music video for "Beautiful" was also released. On November 10, 2022, Time Studios announced a partnership with Roc Nation to produce an upcoming documentary about Aguilera. The documentary which had been quietly in production for 18 months, will be directed by Ting Poo, and provide a look into Aguilera's life story through exclusive previously unseen footage.

Aguilera and its songs received a combined seven nominations at the 23rd Annual Latin Grammy Awards, with the album being nominated for Album of the Year and Best Traditional Pop Vocal Album, winning in the latter category. During the ceremony, Aguilera performed the song "Cuando Me Dé la Gana" with Christian Nodal. The album received another two nominations for Best Latin Pop Album and Best Immersive Audio Album at the 65th Annual Grammy Awards in February 2023. On December 20, 2022, Aguilera performed "Beautiful", "The Voice Within", and "A Million Dreams" alongside a live band during the 2022 VinFuture Prize Award ceremony in Hanoi, Vietnam. In February 2023, Aguilera performed a series of shows in Chile, starting with a headlining set at the Viña del Mar International Song Festival festival in Viña del Mar, and continuing with two more shows at the Movistar Arena in Santiago. Aguilera will be headlining Usher's Lovers and Friends festival on May 6, 2023 in Las Vegas.

Artistry

Voice
Critics have described Aguilera as a soprano, possessing a four-octave vocal range (from C3 to C♯7), being also able to perform the whistle register. After the release of her self-titled debut album, Ron Fair — executive of RCA Records — said he was betting on Aguilera due to her "perfect intonation", considering that she had "pipes to be the next Barbra Streisand or Céline Dion". In an article for Slate, Maura Johnston wrote that although Aguilera works in contemporary pop music, she has "an instrument that despite its ability to leap octaves has a low-end grounding similar to that possessed by opera singers". Highlighting her vocal versatility, Joan Anderman from The Boston Globe stated that she is "a real singer [...] blessed with the sort of breathtaking elasticity, golden tones, and sheer power that separate the divas from the dabblers". Aguilera is also recognized for making use of melisma in her songs and performances; Jon Pareles, writing for The New York Times, analyzed her vocal abilities, emphasizing that "she can aim a note as directly as a missile or turn its trajectory into an aerobatic spiral of leaping, quivering, scalloping melismas". According to critics of Rolling Stone magazine, she has been modeled her "dramatic and melismatic technique" following steps of artists like Etta James.

Throughout her career, her vocal ability has yielded comparisons with other vocalists. As a result of her use of melismatic technique, David Browne associated her with Whitney Houston and Mariah Carey, opining that the three form the team of the main proponents of this vocal modality. Sharing the same point of view, Sasha Frere-Jones, columnist for The New Yorker, expressed that the technique was responsible for making her a "serious singer" without needing to "reincarnate the Sarah Vaughan". Steve Kipner — songwriter of "Genie in a Bottle" (1999) — considered that Aguilera has an "impressive" vocal dexterity, being able to "internalized all the riffs from Chaka Khan". Ann Powers, critic from Los Angeles Times, said that Aguilera has a voice "purely powerful as that of Etta James [...] and she's moving toward the expressiveness of Gladys Knight, if not Aretha Franklin"; however, Powers notes that her vocal ability in ballad songs "connects her to Barbra Streisand", in addition to comparing her to Donna Summer when she works on songs influenced by rhythm and blues.

However, Aguilera has also been criticized for the excessive use of melisma, as well as for oversinging in her songs and concerts. Writing for The Huffington Post, John Eskow stated that she is the main proponent of "oversouling" and, despite recognizing that she has a "great instrument", opined that she "[doesn't] seem to know when to stop" with the use of "gratuitous and confected melisma". Lucy Davies, author at BBC Music, acknowledges that Aguilera has a "stunning voice", but indicated that "she could be more varied, simply by cutting out some of the 'y-e-e-eeeh, woah yeh's' in her songs". During the recording session of "Beautiful" (2002), the producer Linda Perry recalled that Aguilera had difficulty avoiding "vocal improvisations", stopping the recording every time she started to "[oversing]". Perry used the first take, saying, "She had a hard time accepting that as the final track. She's a perfectionist. She knows her voice really well and she knows what's going on. She can hear things that nobody else would catch." In an article for Entertainment Weekly, Chris Willman opined that Aguilera's tendency to oversinging is due to the influence of Carey in her vocal abilities, noting "her slightly nasal tone that really only becomes obvious when she's overselling a song". VH1 writer Alexa Tietjen added that Aguilera "does tend to take it to the extreme at times [...] but Christina's vocal prowess is what's gotten her so far. Love them or hate them, the riffs are a part of who she is as a performer."

Influences
According to Pier Dominguez, the domestic violence that Aguilera suffered during her childhood directly impacted her developing personality. However, the author states that unlike other children who witness the violence at home, she did not show feelings of guilt, emotional disturbance or aggressive behavior towards people; on the contrary, she created an "internal defense mechanism". On the other hand, Chloé Govan comments that the fact that Aguilera had been a victim of bullying at school made her an introverted and insecure person. Her mother's role was crucial in changing this situation, from whom she learned a "message about self-respect". Both authors agree that the learning had a strong influence on Aguilera's behavior in the transition to adulthood and exerted an impact on her early number-one singles in career, "Genie in a Bottle" and "What a Girl Wants" (both from 1999), the lyrics of which can refer to female empowerment.

Aguilera states that her biggest influence in music was Etta James: "[She's] my all-time favorite singer [...] I'll still be as raunchy as I wanna be, and I'll have her memory to back me up. She's what I want to be someday". As her first references to sing and perform, Aguilera credits the musical The Sound of Music (1959) and its lead actress, Julie Andrews;  other of the main inspirations cited throughout her career includes Whitney Houston, Mariah Carey, Michael Jackson, Pearl Bailey, and the bands Red Hot Chili Peppers and Guns N' Roses. Furthermore, Aguilera recalls that she started singing her first songs in Spanish during her childhood because of her parents who constantly listened to works by Julio Iglesias. Other musical inspirations for Aguilera include Chavela Vargas and Vicente Fernández. Aguilera described her song "La Reina" from Aguilera (2022) as a respectful response to Fernández's "El Rey".

In recognition of what she describes as "positive female artists," Aguilera mentioned Madonna and Janet Jackson as artistic influences; in 2000, during an interview with Jam! Canoe, she demonstrated her respect for both singers because they have "taken on the stage, the studio and the screen and have been successful in all three [...] artists who aren't afraid to take chances and be daring, experimental and sexy". Cher was also highlighted as one of Aguilera's source of inspiration in career as she remembered that saw her for the first time in the music video for "If I Could Turn Back Time" (1989), described as a "pivotal moment" that encouraged her as a "woman who's been there, done everything, before everyone else – who had the guts to do it". Billie Holiday and Ella Fitzgerald were Aguilera's biggest influences on her vocal abilities as a child.

Some of her inspirations were portrayed in her artistic work; during the process of developing of her fifth studio album, Back to Basics (2006), Aguilera revealed that she had been influenced by music records from Marvin Gaye, Aretha Franklin, Nina Simone and Otis Redding. In the audiovisual work for "Candyman" (2007), she performed three different roles as an allusion to the interpretation of "Boogie Woogie Bugle Boy" by the group The Andrews Sisters on a brief appearance in the film Buck Privates (1941). Outside the music industry, she mentioned Marilyn Monroe as a reference, paying tribute to the actress in the music video for "Tilt Ya Head Back" (2004) and in movie Burlesque (2010) — where she recorded one of Monroe's most popular songs, "Diamonds Are a Girl's Best Friend", featured in musical Gentlemen Prefer Blondes (1953). Furthermore, Aguilera highlighted her inspirations in the art world, declaring to be an appreciator of works by Andy Warhol, Roy Lichtenstein and Banksy.

Musical style and themes
Generally referred to as a pop artist, Aguilera has gone on to experiment with different musical genres throughout her career. She explains that she always tries to bring something new in her projects, "experiment with [her] voice" in addition to verbalizing her preference of working with more "obscure" collaborators and that she is not necessarily inclined to contact "the number-one chart-toppers in music" because of their popular demand. Reviewing her artistically, Alexis Petridis, columnist from The Guardian, recognized that her "boldness in reinventing herself" was always "one of her most impressive facets," while Kelefa Sanneh from The New York Times highlighted her "decision to snub some of the big-name producers on whom pop stars often rely".

Aguilera's first two records, Christina Aguilera (1999) and Mi Reflejo (2000), were produced with an influsion of teen pop and dance-pop, with the latter also referencing her incentive through Latin music. She showed artistic growth with Stripped (2002) which was described as "substantive and mature [...] with pleasantly surprising depth," where she showed a range of genres, including R&B, hip hop, rock, and soul, and moved away from the teen niche. On her fifth studio album, Back to Basics (2006), Aguilera worked with several producers to create a "throwback with elements of old-school genres combined with a modern-day twist [and] hard-hitting beats". Stephen Thomas Erlewine from AllMusic called the project an "artistic statement [...] a little crass and self-centered, but also catchy, exciting and unique".

In 2010, Aguilera developed the soundtrack for Burlesque, whose content was influenced by Cabaret (1972) and highlighted several songs that were redone as dance numbers in a fashion similar to Moulin Rouge! (2001). In the same year, Bionic saw Aguilera working with producers specialized in electronic music to create a future-pop project with elements taken from electro. Sam Lanksy from MTV Buzzworthy described it as "forward-thinking and even timeless," and praised its "subversive [and] ambient production". Aguilera explored and heavily incorporated electro-pop on Lotus (2012). Conversely, in 2018 she contributed with Kanye West and Anderson Paak on Liberation, creating an album inspired by R&B and hip-hop styles which she had included in her previous material. Aguilera had noted that, "There's nothing like an amazing hip-hop beat. At the end of the day, I am a soul singer [...] singing soulfully is where my core, my root and my heart really is".

Regarding the themes of her music, Aguilera stated that she feels a "sense of responsibility" to reference portions of her personal life so that "people that can relate might not feel as alone in the circumstance". Most of her songs have covered themes of love, motherhood, marriage and fidelity. She has also deal with heavy topics such as domestic violence and abusive relationships. Sex has also played a huge part in Aguilera's music. In an interview with People, she stated, "If I want to be sexual, it's for my own appreciation and enjoyment. That's why I like to talk about the fact that sometimes I am attracted to women. I appreciate their femininity and beauty". Recognized for being feministic in her music, Aguilera denounced the double standard for the first time in "Can't Hold Us Down" (2002), explaining that men are applauded for their sexual behaviors, while women who behave in a similar fashion are disdained. Writing for The Guardian, Hermione Hoby noted that she "incites a sisterly spirit of collaboration [and] not shy of the odd feministic declaration herself".

Image
Aguilera has reinvented her public image numerous times during her career. Early in her career, she was marketed as a bubblegum pop singer due to the genre's high financial return in the late 1990s, becoming a teen idol. Stereogum wrtier Tom Breihan noted that Aguilera "thought of herself primarily as a [...] young Mariah Carey-type, but her A&R rep Ron Fair had instead sent [her] into the pop zeitgeist" of the times. However, she was accused of cultivating a sexual image, attracting criticism regarding her revealing clothes; in an interview with MTV News, Debbie Gibson accused her of "influencing girls out there wearing less and less", considering that "she lives and breathes the sexual image". In response to negative comments, Aguilera stated: "Just because I have a certain image, everyone wants me to be this role model. But nobody is perfect, and nobody can live up to that". Furthermore, her music and image received comparisons to Britney Spears. David Browne, author from Entertainment Weekly, noted that she was "a good girl pretending to be bad" when compared to Spears' music and image. In contrast, Christopher J. Farley of Time considered her a more impressive artist than Spears. Megan Turner from New York Post compared the "battle" between both artists in the media with the previous one between The Beatles and The Rolling Stones; however, she highlighted the difference in them, opining that "while Britney has a va-va-voom sexuality [...] Aguilera had charm and a youthful appeal". Bustle writer James Tison labelled Aguilera a "diva" saying she "mastered being one in the best way possible". He added that "one of her best diva qualities is her willingness to embrace her own sexuality".

In 2002, Aguilera introduced her alter ego Xtina, for which she adopted increasingly provocative and extravagant looks. During this period, she dyed her hair black, debuted body piercings and photographed nude for several publications. While analyzing her new visual, Vice and Rolling Stone magazines wrote that her new clothes echoed as if she were participating in the Girls Gone Wild franchise. On the other hand, she reinforced her new visual direction by dressing up as a nun during a performance of "Dirrty" (2002) accompanied by a choir and undressed to reveal what she would wear underneath to serving as the host of the 2003 MTV Europe Music Awards. In a review of her persona, author Stephen Thomas Erlewine of AllMusic opined that Aguilera reached "maturity with transparent sexuality and pounding sounds of nightclubs". Writing for The Daily Telegraph, Adam White was more positive about her image and recognized that her "embracing of an overtly sexual image in the wake of adolescent stardom was a tried and tested route to adult success".

Under a new persona named Baby Jane — a reference to What Ever Happened to Baby Jane? (1962) — Aguilera again transformed her public image in 2006; sticking to the platinum blonde in her hair, she started to dress inspired by actresses from Old Hollywood. However, in 2010, her new looks were highlighted in the international media for comparisons with those used by Lady Gaga. After gaining weight in 2012, she was criticized by several publications; in the following year, she received favorable media attention after a significant weight loss. In the March 2018 edition of Paper, she appeared without makeup and photographic manipulation, receiving praise and attracting attention to artists who would pose the same way on their social media.

Aguilera has been cited as a sex symbol. Through VH1, she was included in the list of the sexiest entertainment artists in 2002 and 2013; in publications from FHM and Complex, she received similar honors in 2004 and 2012, respectively. In 2003, she was chosen as the sexiest woman of the year by Maxim, stamping the cover of the best-selling issue of the magazine's history. Furthermore, she was mentioned as one of the most beautiful people in the world in 2003 and 2007 in People editions. Aguilera also is recognized a gay icon; in 2019, she was awarded by the Human Rights Campaign for using her "platform to share a message of hope and inspiration to those who have been marginalized [...] bringing greater visibility to the LGBTQ community". Her fashion sense has also attracted media attention throughout her artistic life; Jon Caramanica, journalist from The New York Times, concluded that "Aguilera will be remembered for her glamour and her scandalous take on femme-pop", while Janelle Okwodu from Vogue noted that she "has never been afraid to take a fashion risk [and] has filled her videos with jaw-dropping styles and risqué runway looks". Following her appearance at New York Fashion Week in 2018, Dazed named her one of the most stylish people of the year.

Aguilera has called her fans "fighters", which has become the nickname used on social media to refer to her fanbase. She is one of the most popular musicians on Twitter with approximately 17 million followers, and was one of the most searched artists in the world in 2002, 2004, and 2010 through Google. She was also one of the most popular searches in 2003 by Yahoo! Search. When she became a coach on The Voice, Aguilera became one of the highest-paid American television stars; in 2011, it was reported that she would receive $225,000 per episode, as well as $12 million per season in 2013, $12.5 million in 2014, and $17 million in 2016. In 2007, Forbes included her on its list of richest women in entertainment with an estimated net worth estimated of $60 million, and estimated that she had earned $20 million that year. In 2021, Yahoo! Finance estimated Aguilera's fortune at $160 million.

Legacy
Various music journalists and authors have noted Aguilera's legacy in the entertainment industry and deemed her as one of the greatest artists in pop music. In 2004, she was listed as one of the most influential people in the music market according to The Independent, and was cited as the eight greatest woman in the phonographic industry by VH1. Early in her career, Aguilera was labeled as a teen idol, and has been cited as one of the artists who revived teen pop in the late nineties; Time magazine stated that she was a "pioneer [in] a different type of teen stardom", crediting her vocal ability as responsible for the phenomenon. Since then, she has been named as one of the greatest singers in contemporary pop music; by MTV, she was cited as one of the best voices in music since eighties, while Rolling Stone and Consequence of Sound included her in their lists of greatest singers of all time. In 2013, Latina honored her as the best vocalist of Latin origin in history. With the recognition of her vocal ability and influence in the music industry, she has been referred in media with the titles of "Princess of Pop" and "Voice of a Generation".

Upon launching her music career in the late nineties, Aguilera was cited as one of the artists who shaped the "Latin explosion", having contributed to the Latin pop boom in American music in early of the century. Considered one of the greatest artists of the 2000s, she has been classified between the main references of the Millennials; writing for Vice magazine, Wanna Thompson analyzed her impact in the turn of the century, stating that alongside Britney Spears, "Aguilera dominated mainstream pop-related discussions. [Her] perfectly packaged music and looks appealed to tweens and teens who wanted to be like the pretty, chart-topping pop stars plastered everywhere". The commercial success of her first projects as a bubblegum pop singer caused an effect that influenced record labels to invest in new artists who attracted the same youthful appeal, catapulting names like Jessica Simpson and Mandy Moore.

Critics also highlighted the impact of her work in popular culture; while Stripped (2002) was cited as "the blueprint for divas making the transition from teen idol to adult pop star", Aguilera is credited for "paving the way for a generation of pop singers". Jeff Benjamin from Billboard stated that the album explored a "process of self-identification and declaration still influencing today's mainstream scene", in addition to "how of today's biggest pop stars have followed a similar path, exploring and incorporating these strategies into their careers". In 2007, her self-titled debut album was added to the definitive list from Rock and Roll Hall of Fame, being recognized as one of the "history's most influential and popular albums". Since then, Aguilera and her work have influenced various recording artists including Ariana Grande, Ava Max, Becky G, Britney Spears, Camila Cabello, Charli XCX, Demi Lovato, Dua Lipa, Grimes, Halsey, Hayley Williams, Iggy Azalea, Karol G, Kelly Clarkson, Lady Gaga, Lauren Jauregui, Meghan Trainor, Miley Cyrus, Nicki Nicole, Olivia Rodrigo, Rina Sawayama, Rosalía, Sabrina Carpenter, Sam Smith, Selena Gomez, K. Michelle, and Tinashe, and athletes such as figure skater Johnny Weir, ice dancers Zachary Donohue and Madison Hubbell, and swimmer Dana Vollmer.

Aguilera has also been praised for emphasizing the importance of feminism in pop music; several journalists agree that her use of sexual imagery has helped catalyze public discourse on the topic. Lamar Dawson, columnist from The Huffington Post, praised her feminist efforts in the music industry and recognized that "while Christina isn't the first pop star to place feminist rhetoric into pop culture, she led the charge at the beginning of the 21st century of influencing the next generation of impressionable teens who were too young for Janet [Jackson] and Madonna's curriculum". Gerrick D. Kennedy from Los Angeles Times shared the same point of view and stated that "for a generation who hit puberty during the great 2000 pop explosion, Aguilera was an essential voice with music that tackled self-empowerment, feminism, sex and domestic violence — subject matter her contemporaries were shying away from". Rhiannon Lucy Cosslett, co-founder of The Vagenda, opined that the provocative dance routines in Aguilera's music videos was "empowering", as she has been referred to as the forerunner of the slutdrop dance style.

Aguilera's videography impact was also analysed by music critics. While "Dirrty" (2002) has been described as "one of the most controversial videos in pop music history", and one of the greatest music videos of all time, Issy Beech from i-D recognized that the audiovisual work "paved a path for videos like "Anaconda" and "Wrecking Ball" [...] paved the way for open sexuality from women in pop". In the video for "Beautiful" (2002), the highlight scene of a gay kiss has been considered one of the most important moments for LGBT culture, in addition to start Aguilera's image as a gay icon. Both works was elected as one of the greatest music videos of the 21st century by editors from Billboard, while she was named one of the greatest women of the video era according VH1. In 2012, her videographic collection and some looks used throughout her career were part of an exhibition by the National Museum of Women in the Arts aimed at illustrating "the essential roles women have played in moving rock and roll and American culture forward". Jon Caramanica from The New York Times also commented about her contributions to television, observing an expressive number of artists signing with television networks to act as coaches of singing reality competition after her participation in the American version of The Voice franchise.

Achievements 

Aguilera has accumulated several awards and accolades in her career. At the age of nineteen, she won the Grammy Award for Best New Artist, being recognized by The Recording Academy as one of the youngest singers to receive this award. She has since gone on to win four more Grammys. Furthermore, she has won two Latin Grammy Awards, two MTV Video Music Awards, one Billboard Music Award, one Guinness World Records, and was also nominated with a Golden Globe Award. In 2010, she received a star on Hollywood Walk of Fame in "recognition of her achievements in the recording industry". In 2019, she was also immortalized as a Disney Legend in "honor for her remarkable contributions to the Walt Disney Company". In addition to being often cited as one of the most prominent Latin artists in the entertainment industry, Aguilera was elected as one of the 100 most influential people in the world by Time in 2013.

Aguilera is one of the world's best-selling music artists with an estimated 90 million records sold since 1998. According to Nielsen Soundscan, she has sold over 18.3 million albums in the United States, and her self-titled debut album (1999) was certified 8x platinum and listed as one of the best-selling in the country by the Recording Industry Association of America (RIAA). Regarding her digital sales, it is estimated that she has sold around 21.4 million tracks in the country until 2014. In the United Kingdom, Aguilera has sold over 9.4 million records as of 2013, which 3.3 million in albums sales and 6.1 million in singles sales. According to The Official Charts Company, her fourth studio album Stripped (2002) is one of the few to surpass the 2 million copies sold, becoming the second highest-selling album by an American female artist during the 2000s and one of the best-selling albums of the millennium in the country. Furthermore, "Moves like Jagger" (2011) — her collaboration with band Maroon 5 — was cited as one of the best-selling singles in Australia, Canada, South Korea, the United Kingdom, and the United States, as well as one of the best-selling digital singles with over 14.4 million copies. The song was certified Diamond by the RIAA in 2021.

After being listed as the top female artist of 2000 and 2003, Billboard classified Aguilera as the twentieth most successful artist of the 2000s. Through the same publication, she was considered one of the most successful artists of the decade on Billboard 200, Hot 100, and Mainstream Top 40 charts, and the second best-selling singles artist in the United States, behind Madonna. In 2016, she was also nominated as one of the greatest artists in history of the Mainstream Top 40 and Dance Club Songs charts. In addition, Aguilera was recognized by the magazine as one of the four female artists in history to have a number-one single on the Billboard Hot 100 in three consecutive decades. In 2020, she was cited by Pollstar as one of the top female artists of the 21st century in the concert industry; according to the publication, she sold more than 1.8 million tickets for her performances throughout her career, with an earning exceeding $113.8 million. In Morocco, Aguilera held her largest audience concert, attracting 250,000 people to her performance at Mawazine Festival, becoming the record audience in history of the event.

Other activities

Investments and endorsements 

Outside of her projects in the music industry, Aguilera has worked in other activities. In 2016, after founding her own production company, MX Productions, she signed a contract with Lions Gate Entertainment to develop a music competition program, named Tracks, which was aired on Spike TV. At the same year, it was reported that she was an investor of multiple companies, including Pinterest, DraftKings, Lyft and MasterClass — for which she also developed a singing class. Throughout her career, she has worked with the sale of your own products; in 2011, she attended São Paulo Fashion Week to unveil her first clothes line which was commercialized at the Brazilian department store C&A. In 2007, she introduced her perfume line, Christina Aguilera Fragrances, through Procter & Gamble (P&G), which is maintained with annual releases since then; in addition to being awarded numerous times at the FiFi Awards by The Fragrance Foundation, her fragrances ranked among the United Kingdom's best-sellers in 2007 and 2009. In 2016, Aguilera's fragrance business was acquired by Elizabeth Arden, Inc., where it was estimated that the brand had $80 million in sales and $10 million in earnings in January of that year.

Aguilera has also been involved in marketing initiatives during her career, endorsing numerous brands, including Sears and Levi's (2000), Skechers (2003), Mercedes-Benz, Virgin Mobile (both in 2004), Pepsi, Orange UK, Sony Ericsson (both in 2006), Oreo (2017), and SweeTarts (2021). In 2001, she signed with Coca-Cola to star in a series of television commercials in a deal reported to worth up £50 million. Furthermore, Aguilera inspired a clothing line by Versace in 2003, starring as a model in its advertising campaign; likewise, in 2008, she influenced and appeared in a campaign to promote a collection of sterling silver pieces designed by Stephen Webster. In 2004, it was reported that she earned over £200,000 pounds to open a summer sale at London's department store Harrods. Following the birth of her first child in 2008, Aguilera was paid $1.5 million to submit her baby pictures to People magazine, which became the ninth most expensive celebrity baby photograph ever taken.

Philanthropy 

Aguilera has done numerous philanthropic works during her career. In 2001, she signed an open letter organized by the People for the Ethical Treatment of Animals (PETA) destined to South Korea, appealing on national government to ban the consumption of dogs and cats. In 2006, she replaced a costume designed by Roberto Cavalli for her Back to Basics Tour after discovering that he had used fox fur in its composition. In 2010, Aguilera auctioned tickets to her concerts through Christie's, earmarking the proceeds to non-profit environmental organizations, including Conservation International and the Natural Resources Defense Council. She has also worked to raise awareness of HIV/AIDS; in 2004, she was the face of a make-up line by MAC Cosmetics, profits of which were used to benefit the Mac AIDS Fund. In the following year, Aguilera appeared in a photo book which raised funds for the Elton John AIDS Foundation, in addition to starring in a campaign organized by YouthAIDS.

In 2003, Aguilera visited and donated over $200,000 dollars to the Women's Center & Shelter of Greater Pittsburgh, a support center for victims of domestic violence. In 2019, she donated part of the proceeds from her residency concert to an organization based in Las Vegas, Nevada. Furthermore, she has starred in commercials on the Lifetime channel calling for an end to violence against women, and collaborated with institutions that fight breast cancer. In 2005, she participated in a gala event designed to raise funds for child support organizations, including Nelson Mandela Children's Fund; similarly, in 2008, she participated in the Turkish version of the game show Deal or No Deal, where she earned ₺180,000 lire — an amount converted into donations to the country's orphanages. In a Montblanc initiative, she participated in a charity event promoting children's access to music education in 2010. Aguilera was also involved in campaigns to encourage people to vote. During the 2004 United States presidential election, she was featured on advertising panels for Declare Yourself and served as a spokesperson for Rock the Vote in the 2008 presidential election.

In 2005, Aguilera donated her wedding gifts to charities in support of families affected by Hurricane Katrina. In 2012, as a result of the disaster caused by Hurricane Sandy, she participated in a special organized by National Broadcasting Company (NBC), where she performed the song "Beautiful" (2002) and asked for donations to the American Red Cross. In response to the 2010 Haiti earthquake, she auctioned off a Chrysler 300 and used the money raised to help disaster victims. She additionally appeared on the Hope for Haiti Now telethon, where donations directly benefited Oxfam America, Partners In Health, Red Cross, and UNICEF. In 2009, she became the global spokesperson for the World Food Program, a branch of the United Nations (UN). Through the program, she traveled to several countries with high rates of malnutrition, such as Guatemala, Ecuador, and Rwanda. Since then, it is estimated that she has helped raise more than $148 million for the organization and other hunger relief agencies in 45 countries. In 2012, her role in the project earned her the George McGovern Leadership Award, which she received in the White House from former Secretary of State, Hillary Clinton.

In 2016, Aguilera donated proceeds of her single "Change" to the victims and families of the Orlando nightclub shooting. Aguilera noted that, "Like so many, I want to help be part of the change this world needs to make it a beautiful, inclusive place where humanity can love each other freely and passionately".

Personal life 
Aguilera was in a relationship with her backup dancer Jorge Santos from 2000. The two were in a relationship for two years, until their breakup in 2002. Aguilera wrote the songs "Infatuation" and "Underappreciated" from Stripped about him, and later revealed that Santos was gay.

Following her breakup from Santos, Aguilera began a relationship with music producer and executive Jordan Bratman in 2002, and were engaged in February 2005. The two married during a wedding in Napa Valley, estimated to have cost $2 million, on November 19, 2005. Footage from the wedding was featured in the music video for "Save Me From Myself" from Back to Basics. On January 12, 2008, Aguilera gave birth to their son, Max Liron Bratman. The two began having marital problems after Aguilera finished filming for Burlesque and separated in September 2010. Aguilera commented on their separation, saying: "When I finished filming, I didn’t feel right in my own shoes [at home]. I had a lot of things stirring inside of me that I felt were being suppressed. We tried to work on the marriage and figure out a common ground. But the problems were obvious". They announced their separation on October 12, 2010, and Aguilera filed for divorce on October 14, citing irreconcilable differences and seeking joint custody of their son. Their divorce was finalized on April 15, 2011.

Aguilera met Matthew Rutler in 2009 on the set of Burlesque, where he worked as a production assistant. The two began dating after Aguilera filed for divorce from Bratman in late 2010, and became engaged on February 14, 2014. Aguilera gave birth to their daughter, Summer Rain Rutler on August 16, 2014, via cesarean section at Cedars-Sinai Medical Center.

On March 1, 2011, Aguilera and Rutler were arrested while driving in West Hollywood. Rutler, who was driving, was pulled over at 2:45 AM EST, and was arrested for drunk driving. Aguilera was a passenger and taken into custody for public intoxication and later released with no charges at 10:30 AM EST once she was able to navigate and think on her own, while Rutler was released on $5,000 bail. It was later reported that Rutler's blood alcohol level was .06, which is below the California legal limit of .08, and the case against him was dropped due to insufficient evidence. Aguilera later commented on the arrest in an interview with W, saying: "It never should have happened in the first place. The police knew my recent history and wanted to jump on the bandwagon. I don’t mean to martyr myself, but I think I was a victim of celebrity. I don’t drive, I wasn’t driving, and I committed no crimes, but they put me in jail. They called me a ‘political hot potato.’ They said, ‘What are we going to do with this woman?’ I think they were bored that night."

Discography

Studio albums
 Christina Aguilera (1999)
 Mi Reflejo (2000)
 My Kind of Christmas (2000)
 Stripped (2002)
 Back to Basics (2006)
 Bionic (2010)
 Lotus (2012)
 Liberation (2018)
 Aguilera (2022)

Filmography

 Shark Tale (2004)
 Shine a Light (2008)
 Get Him to the Greek (2010)
 Burlesque (2010)
 Casa de mi Padre (2012)

 Pitch Perfect 2 (2015)
 The Emoji Movie (2017)
 Zoe (2018)
 Life of the Party (2018)

Tours and residencies

 Headlining tours 
 Christina Aguilera in Concert (2000–2001)
 The Stripped Tour (2003)
 Back to Basics Tour (2006–2008)
 The Liberation Tour (2018)
 The X Tour (2019)

 Co-headlining tours 
 The Justified & Stripped Tour (with Justin Timberlake) (2003)

 Residencies 
 Christina Aguilera: The Xperience (2019–2020)

 Promotional tours 
 EU / UK Summer Series (2022)

See also

 Honorific nicknames in popular music
 List of best-selling music artists
 List of best-selling female music artists
 List of artists who reached number one in the United States
 List of artists who reached number one on the UK Singles Chart

References

Sources

Further reading

External links

 
 
 
 
 

 
1980 births
Living people
20th-century American actresses
20th-century American singers
20th-century American women singers
21st-century American actresses
21st-century American singers
21st-century American women singers
Activists from New York City
Actresses from Los Angeles
Actresses from New York City
Actresses from Pittsburgh
Ambassadors of supra-national bodies
American child actresses
American child singers
American contemporary R&B singers
American dance musicians
American dancers
American expatriates in Japan
American female dancers
American feminists
American film actresses
American Latin pop singers
American LGBT rights activists
American people of Dutch descent
American people of Ecuadorian descent
American people of German descent
American people of Irish descent
American people of Welsh descent
American philanthropists
American sopranos
American soul singers
American television actresses
American voice actresses
American women pop singers
American women record producers
American women singer-songwriters
Businesspeople from Los Angeles
Businesspeople from New York City
Businesspeople from Pittsburgh
Child pop musicians
Dance-pop musicians
Dancers from New York (state)
Feminist musicians
Grammy Award winners
Hispanic and Latino American actresses
Hispanic and Latino American feminists
Hispanic and Latino American women singers
HIV/AIDS activists
Judges in American reality television series
Latin Grammy Award winners
Mouseketeers
MTV Europe Music Award winners
Music video codirectors
Musicians from Pittsburgh
People from Rochester, Pennsylvania
People from Staten Island
RCA Records artists
Record producers from California
Record producers from Los Angeles
Record producers from New York (state)
Record producers from Pennsylvania
Sex-positive feminists
Singers from Los Angeles
Singers from New York City
Singers with a four-octave vocal range
Singer-songwriters from California
Singer-songwriters from New York (state)
Singer-songwriters from Pennsylvania
Sony BMG artists
Sony Music Latin artists
Spanish-language singers of the United States
Television personalities from California
Television personalities from New York City
Television personalities from Pittsburgh
Women in Latin music
World Food Programme people
World Music Awards winners